Harry Chapman Ford was a playwright and novelist in the United States. Two of his plays and one of his novels were adapted to film.

Early life

Henry Chapman Ford was born in Baltimore, Maryland. His mother was actress Blanche Chapman. His father was Henry Clay Ford, owner of Ford's Theatre. He had two brothers, Frank A. and George D.

Career

Two of Ford's plays and one of his books were made into films. He was a stage director for theaters, and toured internationally with the theater adaptation of The Garden of Allah. He directed Viola Allen.

Later life and death

Ford never married. He died in May 1938 at his home in Rutherford, New Jersey of a coronary thrombosis, outlived by his two brothers and mother.

Theater
Anna Ascends (1920)
Eve's Leaves (1925)
Ebb Tide (1931)

Filmography
Anna Ascends (1922)
Eve's Leaves (1926) adapted by Paul Sloane from Ford's 1925 play of the same name 
Shadow of the Law (1926) adapted by Leah Baird and Grover Jones from Ford's novel Two Gates

References

External links

Year of birth missing
Year of death missing
20th-century American dramatists and playwrights
20th-century American novelists
20th-century American male writers
American male dramatists and playwrights
American male novelists
People from Rutherford, New Jersey
Writers from Baltimore
Deaths from coronary thrombosis
Novelists from New Jersey
Novelists from Maryland